Moriya Jutanugarn (born 28 July 1994) is a Thai professional golfer.

In 2009, Jutanugarn became the first female to win the Duke of York Young Champions Trophy. In 2013, she was named LPGA Rookie of the Year. She has played on the LPGA Tour since 2013.

Her sister, Ariya, also plays on the LPGA Tour. Moriya won her first event in her 156th start at the 2018 Hugel-JTBC LA Open. Moriya and Ariya are the second set of sisters to win on the LPGA, after Charlotta and Annika Sörenstam. In July 2021, she secured her second LPGA win alongside her sister, Ariya, at the Dow Great Lakes Bay Invitational in Michigan.

Amateur wins
this list may be incomplete
2008 Junior Open Championship
2009 Duke of York Young Champions Trophy
2012 South Atlantic Ladies Amateur

Source:

Professional wins (2)

LPGA Tour wins (2)

Results in LPGA majors
Results not in chronological order before 2019 or in 2020.

^ The Evian Championship was added as a major in 2013.

CUT = missed the half-way cut
NT = no tournament
"T" = tied

Summary

Most consecutive cuts made – 23 (2016 U.S. Open – 2021 ANA Inspiration)
Longest streak of top-10s – 2 (2020 U.S. Open – 2021 ANA Inspiration)

LPGA Tour career summary

As of 2021 season
* Includes matchplay and other events without a cut.

Team appearances
Amateur
Espirito Santo Trophy (representing Thailand): 2008

Professional
International Crown (representing Thailand): 2014, 2016, 2018
Amata Friendship Cup (representing Thailand): 2018 (winners)

References

External links

Moriya Jutanugarn profile at Yahoo! Sports

Moriya Jutanugarn
LPGA Tour golfers
Moriya Jutanugarn
1994 births
Living people
Moriya Jutanugarn